Oti or OTI may refer to:

Places
Oti, Jõgeva County, a village in Torma Parish, Estonia
Oti, Saare County, a village in Pöide Parish, Estonia
Oti, Viljandi County, a village in Karksi Parish, Estonia
Oti Prefecture, Togo
Oti Region, Ghana
Oti River, which flows through Benin, Togo, and Ghana

People

Given name or nickname 
 Oti (footballer) (born 1969), Spanish footballer
 Oti Akenteng (born 1955), Ghanaian footballer
 Oti Mabuse (born 1990), a South African professional Latin American and ballroom dancer

Surname 
 Chijioke Oti, Anglican bishop in Nigeria
 Chris Oti (born 1965), English rugby union player
 Martin Gyarko Oti (born 1980), Ghanaian politician
 Nnenna Oti (born 1958), Nigerian academic
 Patteson Oti (born 1956), Solomon Islands politician and diplomat
 Manuel Mur Oti (1908–2003), Spanish screenwriter and film director

Education 
 Oklahoma Technology Institute, in Oklahoma City, Oklahoma, United States
 Ottawa Torah Institute, in Ottawa, Ontario, Canada

Other uses
 OTI Festival, an annual singing competition
 Oti Fossae, on Mars
 Oti language, an extinct language of Brazil
 Leo Wattimena Airport (IATA: OTI), on Morotai Island, North Maluku, Indonesia
 Object Technology International, a Canadian software company founded in 1988 and acquired by IBM in 1996
 Ocean transportation intermediary
 Office of Transition Initiatives, part of the United States Agency for International Development
 On Thin Ice (comedy group), a Harvard University improvisation comedy troupe
 On Track Innovations, an Israeli financial services company
 Open Technology Institute, a technology program of the New America Foundation
 Organización de Telecomunicaciones de Iberoamérica, an organization of television networks in Latin America, Spain and Portugal